Taujėnai Manor is a former residential manor in Taujėnai, Ukmergė district, Lithuania. Currently it is used as a hotel and restaurant.

References

Manor houses in Lithuania
Classicism architecture in Lithuania